Li On Shimon Mizrahi (born 24 October 2002) is an Israeli footballer who currently plays as a midfielder for Beitar Jerusalem.

His father is the former Israeli footballer Eitan Mizrahi.

Career statistics

Club

References

2002 births
Living people
Israeli footballers
Footballers from Jerusalem
Beitar Jerusalem F.C. players
Hapoel Tel Aviv F.C. players
Israeli Premier League players
Israel youth international footballers
Association football defenders